Shrinivas Ramchandra Kulkarni (born 4 October 1956) is a US-based astronomer born and raised in India. He is currently a professor of astronomy and planetary science at California Institute of Technology, and he served as director of Caltech Optical Observatory (COO) at California Institute of Technology, in which capacity he oversaw the Palomar and Keck among other telescopes. He is the recipient of a number of awards and honours.

Early life and education
Shrinivas Ramchandra Kulkarni was born on 4 October 1956 in the small town of Kurundwad in Maharashtra, into a Deshastha Madhva Brahmin family. His father, Dr. R. H. Kulkarni, was a surgeon based in Hubballi and his mother, Vimala Kulkarni, was a home-maker. He is one of four children and has three sisters, Sunanda Kulkarni, Sudha Murthy (wife of Infosys founder Narayana Murthy) and Jaishree Deshpande (wife of Gururaj Deshpande).

Kulkarni and his sisters grew up in Hubballi, Karnataka, and received their schooling at local schools there. He obtained his MS in physics (integrated master's course) from the Indian Institute of Technology, Delhi in 1978 and his PhD from the University of California, Berkeley in 1983.

Career
In 1987, Kulkarni obtained a position as faculty at the California Institute of Technology. According to his website, he has mentored 64 young scholars by the end of 2016.

Kulkarni is known for making key discoveries that open new sub-fields within astronomy, using wide range of wavelength in observation.  ADS shows that his papers cover following fields:  (1) HI absorption studies of Milky Way Galaxy, (2) pulsars, millisecond pulsars, and globular cluster pulsars, (3) brown dwarfs and other sub-stellar objects, (4) soft gamma-ray repeaters, (5) gamma-ray bursts, and (6) optical transients.  He made significant contributions in these sub-fields of astronomy.

Key discoveries
Kulkarni started off his career as a radio astronomer. He studied Milky Way Galaxy using HI absorption under the guidance of his advisor Carl Heiles, and observed its four arms. The review articles he wrote with Carl Heiles have been highly cited in the field of interstellar medium.

He discovered the first millisecond pulsar called PSR B1937+21 with Donald Backer and colleagues, while he was a graduate student.  In 1986, he found the first optical counterpart of binary pulsars, while he was a Millikan Fellow at California Institute of Technology. He was instrumental in discovery of the first globular cluster pulsar in 1987 using a supercomputer.

With Dale Frail at NRAO and Toshio Murakami and his colleagues at ISAS (predecessor of JAXA that was led by Yasuo Tanaka at that time) Kulkarni showed that soft gamma-ray repeaters are neutron stars associated with supernova remnants. This discovery eventually led to the understanding that neutron stars with extremely high magnetic field called magnetars are the soft gamma-ray repeaters.

Caltech-NRAO team which he led showed in 1997 that gamma-ray bursts came from extra-galactic sources, and identified optical counterparts. Their research initiated the detailed studies of the sources of gamma-ray bursts along with the European team led by Jan van Paradijs.

He was also a member of the Caltech team that observed the first irrefutable brown dwarf in 1994 that orbited around a star called Gliese 229.

His recent work involved Palomar Transient Factory which has succeeded in identifying the new groups of optical transients such as superluminous supernovae, calcium-rich supernovae, and luminous red novae.

The success of his astronomical research is evident by 63 Nature Letters, 7 Science Letters, and total of 479 refereed scientific articles that bear his name by the end of 2015, according to ADS. Recognizing his contribution to astronomy, he was awarded the Dan David Prize in 2017.

Awards and honours
Kulkarni has received many awards and honours, including the NSF's Alan T. Waterman Award in 1992, the Helen B. Warner Prize from the American Astronomical Society in
1991, the Jansky Prize in 2002 and the Dan David Prize in 2017. In 2015, he received an honorary doctorate from Radboud University in the Netherlands.

Services to the field
Kulkarni has been the Jury Chair for the Infosys Prize for the discipline of Physical Sciences since 2009. The prize is awarded by the Infosys Foundation, whose founder is Kulkarni's brother-in-law, Narayana Murthy.

Kulkarni is a member of as many as four national academies around the globe. He was elected a Fellow of the Royal Society, London, in 2001, a member of the United States National Academy of Sciences in 2003, an honorary fellow of Indian Academy of Sciences in 2012, and a foreign member of the Royal Netherlands Academy of Arts and Sciences on 12 September 2016.

References

External links
  Royal Society, London
  Geology and Planetary Science, Caltech
  Personal webpage
   United States National Academy of Sciences
   Indian Academy of Science
  Royal Netherlands Academy of Arts and Sciences
  National Science Foundation: Waterman Prize
    National Radio Astronomy Observatory: Jansky Prize
    Dan David Prize
  Infosys Science Prize Jury Chairs
 An accomplished observer Frontline - 27 Oct - 9 Nov 2001
 Nature Podcast 24 May 2007 - Nature
 Kulkarni Inducted Into The Royal Society, 2001

Planetary scientists
1956 births
Living people
California Institute of Technology faculty
Fellows of the Royal Society
Members of the Royal Netherlands Academy of Arts and Sciences
Members of the United States National Academy of Sciences
20th-century Indian astronomers
Indian emigrants to the United States
IIT Delhi alumni
University of California, Berkeley alumni
American Hindus
American people of Marathi descent
Scientists from California
21st-century American astronomers
20th-century American physicists
American academics of Indian descent
Indian scholars